Yarisleidis Peña (born 10 February 1979) is a Cuban softball player. She competed in the women's tournament at the 2000 Summer Olympics.

References

1979 births
Living people
Cuban softball players
Olympic softball players of Cuba
Softball players at the 2000 Summer Olympics
People from Granma Province